Todd Snare (born Todd Lowther) is a drummer.

It was announced on February 4, 2010 that Groove Theory is back in the studio working on a reunion album.  New material will be available in about two months according to the group's management.

References

External links
 Native Deens: Biography of Tariq Snare

Living people
American Muslims
Performers of Islamic music
Converts to Islam
Year of birth missing (living people)